A mixotroph is an organism that can use a mix of different sources of energy and carbon, instead of having a single trophic mode on the continuum from complete autotrophy at one end to heterotrophy at the other. It is estimated that mixotrophs comprise more than half of all microscopic plankton. There are two types of eukaryotic mixotrophs: those with their own chloroplasts, and those with endosymbionts—and those that acquire them through kleptoplasty or through symbiotic associations with prey or enslavement of their organelles.

Possible combinations are photo- and chemotrophy, litho- and organotrophy (osmotrophy, phagotrophy and myzocytosis), auto- and heterotrophy or other combinations of these. Mixotrophs can be either eukaryotic or prokaryotic. They can take advantage of different environmental conditions.

If a trophic mode is obligate, then it is always necessary for sustaining growth and maintenance; if facultative, it can be used as a supplemental source. Some organisms have incomplete Calvin cycles, so they are incapable of fixing carbon dioxide and must use organic carbon sources.

Overview 
Organisms may employ mixotrophy obligately or facultatively.
 Obligate mixotrophy: To support growth and maintenance, an organism must utilize both heterotrophic and autotrophic means.
 Obligate autotrophy with facultative heterotrophy: Autotrophy alone is sufficient for growth and maintenance, but heterotrophy may be used as a supplementary strategy when autotrophic energy is not enough, for example, when light intensity is low.
 Facultative autotrophy with obligate heterotrophy: Heterotrophy is sufficient for growth and maintenance, but autotrophy may be used to supplement, for example, when prey availability is very low.
 Facultative mixotrophy: Maintenance and growth may be obtained by heterotrophic or autotrophic means alone, and mixotrophy is used only when necessary.

Plants 

Amongst plants, mixotrophy classically applies to carnivorous, hemi-parasitic and myco-heterotrophic species. However, this characterisation as mixotrophic could be extended to a higher number of clades as research demonstrates that organic forms of nitrogen and phosphorus — such as DNA, proteins, amino-acids or carbohydrates — are also part of the nutrient supplies of a number of plant species.

Animals 

Mixotrophy is less common among animals than among plants and microbes, but there are many examples of mixotrophic invertebrates and at least one example of a mixotrophic vertebrate. 

 The spotted salamander, Ambystoma maculatum, also hosts microalgae within its cells. Its embryos have been found to have symbiotic algae living inside them, the only known example of vertebrate cells hosting an endosymbiont microbe (unless mitochondria is considered).

 Zoochlorella is a nomen rejiciendum for a genus of green algae assigned to Chlorella. The term zoochlorella (plural zoochlorellae) is sometimes used to refer to any green algae that lives symbiotically within the body of a freshwater or marine invertebrate or protozoan.

 Reef-building corals (Scleractinia), like many other cnidarians (e.g. jellyfish, anemones), host endosymbiotic microalgae within their cells, thus making them mixotrophs. 
 The Oriental hornet, Vespa orientalis, can obtain energy from sunlight absorbed by its cuticle. It thus contrasts with the other animals listed here, which are mixotrophic with the help of endosymbionts.

Microorganisms

Bacteria and archaea
 Paracoccus pantotrophus is a bacterium that can live chemoorganoheterotrophically, whereby a large variety of organic compounds can be metabolized. Also a facultative chemolithoautotrophic metabolism is possible, as seen in colorless sulfur bacteria (some Thiobacillus), whereby sulfur compounds such as hydrogen sulfide, elemental sulfur, or thiosulfate are oxidized to sulfate. The sulfur compounds serve as electron donors and are consumed to produce ATP.  The carbon source for these organisms can be carbon dioxide (autotrophy) or organic carbon (heterotrophy).Organoheterotrophy can occur under aerobic or under anaerobic conditions; lithoautotrophy takes place aerobically.

Protists

To characterize the sub-domains within mixotrophy, several very similar categorization schemes have been suggested. Consider the example of a marine protist with heterotrophic and photosynthetic capabilities:
In the breakdown put forward by Jones, there are four mixotrophic groups based on relative roles of phagotrophy and phototrophy.
 A: Heterotrophy (phagotrophy) is the norm, and phototrophy is only used when prey concentrations are limiting.
 B: Phototrophy is the dominant strategy, and phagotrophy is employed as a supplement when light is limiting.
 C: Phototrophy results in substances for both growth and ingestion, phagotrophy is employed when light is limiting.
 D: Phototrophy is most common nutrition type, phagotrophy only used during prolonged dark periods, when light is extremely limiting.

An alternative scheme by Stoeker also takes into account the role of nutrients and growth factors, and includes mixotrophs that have a photosynthetic symbiont or who retain chloroplasts from their prey. This scheme characterizes mixotrophs by their efficiency.
 Type 1: "Ideal mixotrophs" that use prey and sunlight equally well
 Type 2: Supplement phototrophic activity with food consumption
 Type 3: Primarily heterotrophic, use phototrophic activity during times of very low prey abundance.

Another scheme, proposed by Mitra et al., specifically classifies marine planktonic mixotrophs so that mixotrophy can be included in ecosystem modeling. This scheme classified organisms as: 

 Constitutive mixtotrophs (CMs): phagotrophic organisms that are inherently able to also photosynthesize 
 Non-constitutive mixotrophs (NCMs): phagotrophic organisms that must ingest prey to attain the ability to photosynthesize. NCMs are further broken down into:
 Specific non-constitutive mixotrophs (SNCMs), which only gain the ability to photosynthesize from a specific prey item (either by retaining plastids only in kleptoplastidy or by retaining whole prey cells in endosymbiosis)
 General non-constitutive mixotrophs (GNCM), which can gain the ability to photosynthesize from a variety of prey items

See also
 Primary nutritional groups
 Photosynthesis

Notes

External links

 Sanders, Robert  W.  Mixotrophic Nutrition of Phytoplankton: Venus Fly Traps of the microbial world .  Temple University.

Microbiology
Trophic ecology